Frankenstein is the title of several horror-adventure films loosely based on the 1818 novel Frankenstein; or, The Modern Prometheus by Mary Shelley, centered on Baron Victor Frankenstein, who experiments in creating a creature beyond human.

Hammer Horror film series (1957–1974)
The original series of films consisted of seven installments, which starred well-known horror actors such as Peter Cushing and Christopher Lee as Baron Victor Frankenstein and his creature respectively. The series of films is part of the larger Hammer Horror series.

Producer Max Rosenberg originally approached Michael Carreras at Hammer Films with a deal to produce Frankenstein and the Monster (Rosenberg claims that he came up with the title) from a script by Milton Subotsky. Later, both men were cut out of their profit participation making only a $5000 fee for bringing the production to Hammer. Rosenberg and Subotsky later established Amicus Films, Hammer's main rival in the production of horror films during the 1960s. Screenwriter Jimmy Sangster, who adapted Mary Shelley's novel for Hammer, never mentioned seeing Subotsky's script or being aware of Rosenberg's involvement. Sangster had worked as a production manager and said that he was keenly aware of production costs and kept the budget in mind when writing the script. Sangster said that his awareness of cost influenced him to not write scenes involving the villagers storming the castle that was typically seen in the Universal horror films "because we couldn't afford it". Sangster in an interview with film historian Jonathan Rigby indicated that he hadn't seen any of the Frankenstein films that Universal made. He just adapted the book "the way I saw it".

Peter Cushing, who was then best known for his many high-profile roles in British television, had his first lead part in a film with The Curse of Frankenstein. Meanwhile, Christopher Lee's casting resulted largely from his height (6'5"), though Hammer had earlier considered the even taller (6'7") Bernard Bresslaw for the role. Universal fought hard to prevent Hammer from duplicating aspects of their 1931 film, and so it was down to make-up artist Phil Leakey to design a new look for the creature bearing no resemblance to the Boris Karloff original created by Jack Pierce. Production of The Curse of Frankenstein began, with an investment of £65,000, on 19 November 1956 at Bray Studios with a scene showing Baron Frankenstein cutting down a highwayman from a wayside gibbet. The film opened at the London Pavilion on 2 May 1957 with an X certificate from the censors.

Hammer's first colour horror film, its worldwide success led to several sequels, the studio's new versions of Dracula (1958) and The Mummy (1959), and established "Hammer Horror" as a new distinctive brand of Gothic cinema. 

 The Curse of Frankenstein (1957)   Victor Frankenstein (Peter Cushing) is a brilliant scientist willing to stop at nothing in his quest to reanimate a deceased body. After alienating his longtime friend and partner, Paul Krempe (Robert Urquhart), with his extreme methods, Frankenstein assembles a hideous creature (Christopher Lee) out of dead body parts and succeeds in bringing it to life. But the monster is not as obedient or docile as Frankenstein expected, and it runs amok, resulting in murder and mayhem.
 The Revenge of Frankenstein (1958)   With the help of Karl (Oscar Quitak), the crippled dwarf hangman, whom he promises a new body, Baron Frankenstein escapes from the guillotine and goes to Germany, where under the name Stein, alongside his eager young assistant Hans Kleve (Francis Matthews), they transplant Karl's brain into the new patchwork body (Michael Gwynn). The operation is successful but as the body's limbs begin to return to the old crippled positions of Karl, Karl escapes and goes on a cannibalistic rampage, calling out the name of "Frankenstein".
 The Evil of Frankenstein (1964)   Dr. Frankenstein returns destitute to his home village to recommence his experimental research into the reanimation of dead tissue, and stumbles upon his old monster (Kiwi Kingston) suspended in ice. Though he revives the creature, Frankenstein must seek the help of hypnotist Zoltan (Peter Woodthorpe) to repair its mind. Zoltan then assumes control of the monster, using him to wreak havoc. But when Frankenstein tries to regain power over his creation, he becomes Zoltan's next target.
 Frankenstein Created Woman (1967)   After being reanimated, Baron Frankenstein transfers the soul of his unjustly framed and guillotined assistant Hans (Robert Morris) into the body of his lover Christina (Susan Denberg) after she had subsequently committed suicide, prompting her, with his memory, to kill the men who wronged them and avenge their deaths.
 Frankenstein Must Be Destroyed (1969)   When Frankenstein, who looks forward to meet and work with former associate Dr. Frederick Brandt (George Pravda), learns about his unstable mind and subsequent confinement to a lunatic asylum, he decides to transplant Brandt's brain into another body (Freddie Jones) in an attempt to cure him, and to acquire the information behind a secret formula known only to him.
 The Horror of Frankenstein (1970)   A tongue-in-cheek black comedy chiller and remake of The Curse of Frankenstein about a ruthlessly sadistic student who will stop at nothing in pursuit of advancing his shocking scientific experiments, Young Victor Frankenstein (Ralph Bates) murders his own father (George Belbin) in order to inherit his title and fortune, and drops out of school to concentrate on his unholy attempts to resurrect the dead (David Prowse).
 Frankenstein and the Monster from Hell (1974)   Convicted of body-snatching, Dr. Simon Helder (Shane Briant) is sentenced to an insane asylum. On arrival, he recognizes the resident surgeon as the infamous Baron Victor Frankenstein (Peter Cushing), who has been hiding out there under the guise of Dr Carl Victor, discovering that Frankenstein has been assembling a new creature using the body of an insane murderer (David Prowse), the brain of a musical and mathematical genius (Charles Lloyd-Pack) and the hands of a sculptor (Bernard Lee). Unable to operate himself due to his hands having been burnt, Frankenstein has been relying on his mute assistant Sarah (Madeline Smith) to stitch the body parts together, now turning to Helder for help. After the operation is a success, the creature is torn between the conflicting aspects of itself – an intelligent, artistic person imprisoned in the body of a murderous hulk. Escaping from its cell, the creature then sets out to hunt down those who abused him – starting with the asylum’s corrupt director (John Stratton)…

Tales of Frankenstein television pilot

In 1959, Hammer shot a half-hour pilot episode for a television series to be called Tales of Frankenstein, in association with Columbia Pictures, directed by Curt Siodmak. Anton Diffring played the Baron, and Don Megowan his creation. The series was scrapped, largely because of the two companies' disagreement over what the basic thrust of the series would be: Hammer wanted to do a series about Baron Frankenstein involved in various misadventures, while Columbia wanted a series of loosely-connected science fiction loosely based around the idea of science gone wrong. Though unreleased at the time of its production, the episode is available on DVD from several public domain sources. Though the series was never produced, Anthony Hinds commissioned several scripts that provided Hammer with material for their later Frankenstein films, specifically Frankenstein Created Woman and The Evil of Frankenstein.

Feature films

Cast and characters

Crew

References

Citations

Sources
 

Film series introduced in 1957
Hammer Film Productions horror films
Resurrection in film
Frankenstein films
Film series based on novels
Horror film series